seven nights is a week.

Seven Nights, 1984 book by Jorge Luis Borges 
7 Nights (mixtape) 2017
Seven Nights in Japan 1976 drama film directed by Lewis Gilbert and starring Michael York